Camp Byers is a Spanish seasonal base camp on Byers Peninsula, Livingston Island in the South Shetland Islands, Antarctica. The locality is also designated for use as an International Field Camp. When necessary for scientific research purposes, temporary camping is allowed elsewhere on the protected peninsula under certain conditions.

The area was visited by early 19th century sealers.

Location
The encampment is 1.2 km north-northwest of Nikopol Point, 1.04 km northeast of Sealer Hill, 3.13 km south by west of Chester Cone and 4.38 km west of Dometa Point (detailed Spanish mapping of the area in 1992, Bulgarian mapping in 2005 and 2009).

See also
 Byers Peninsula
 Livingston Island
 Juan Carlos I Base
 List of Antarctic research stations
 List of Antarctic field camps

Maps
 Península Byers, Isla Livingston. Mapa topográfico a escala 1:25000. Madrid: Servicio Geográfico del Ejército, 1992. (Map image on p. 55 of the linked study)
 L.L. Ivanov et al. Antarctica: Livingston Island and Greenwich Island, South Shetland Islands. Scale 1:100000 topographic map. Sofia: Antarctic Place-names Commission of Bulgaria, 2005.
 L.L. Ivanov. Antarctica: Livingston Island and Greenwich, Robert, Snow and Smith Islands. Scale 1:120000 topographic map.  Troyan: Manfred Wörner Foundation, 2009.  
 Antarctic Digital Database (ADD). Scale 1:250000 topographic map of Antarctica. Scientific Committee on Antarctic Research (SCAR). Since 1993, regularly upgraded and updated.
 L.L. Ivanov. Antarctica: Livingston Island and Smith Island. Scale 1:100000 topographic map. Manfred Wörner Foundation, 2017.

Notes

References
 Juan José Durán, Ana Justel Eusebio. La Península Byers: La vida en el Campamento Byers (III). Terralia, Nº 48, 2005, pags. 80–91. ISSN 1138-6223 
 Ivanov, L. General Geography and History of Livingston Island. In: Bulgarian Antarctic Research: A Synthesis. Eds. C. Pimpirev and N. Chipev. Sofia: St. Kliment Ohridski University Press, 2015. pp. 17–28. 

Outposts of the South Shetland Islands
Geography of Livingston Island
Outposts of Antarctica
2001 establishments in Antarctica
2001 establishments in Spain
Spain and the Antarctic